Ricarda is a German feminine given name and may refer to:

 Ricarda Ciontos (born 1968), German actress
 Ricarda Funk (born 1992), German slalom canoeist 
 Ricarda Haaser (born 1993), Austrian skier
 Ricarda Huch (1864–1947), German intellectual
 Ricarda Lang (born 1994), German politician
 Ricarda Lima (born 1970), Brazilian volleyballer
 Ricarda Lisk (born 1981), German triathlete
 Ricarda Lobe (born 1994), German hurdler
 Ricarda Multerer (born 1990), German épée fencer
 Ricarda Walkling (born 1997), German footballer

See also
 Riccarda Dietsche (born 1996) is a Swiss athlete
 Riccarda Mazzotta (born 1986), Swiss racing cyclist
 Ricciarda Cybo-Malaspina (1497–1553), Italian noblewoman
 Ricciarda of Saluzzo (1410–1474), Italian noblewoman
 879 Ricarda, minor planet
 Ričardas, Lithuanian cognate of Richard
 Ricarda Jordan, pen name of German novelist Christiane Gohl

German feminine given names